Echinoderm microtubule-associated protein-like 4 is a protein that in humans is encoded by the EML4 gene.

This protein is involved in cancers when spliced with the  anaplastic lymphoma kinase.

References

Further reading

External links